Jorpati is a village and former Village Development Committee that is now part of Gokarneshwar Municipality in Kathmandu District in Province No. 3 of central Nepal. At the 2011 census it had a population of 84,567 making it one of the largest villages in the world. At the time of the 1991 Nepal census it had a population of 10,796 and had 1,988 households in it.

In the year 2016 Jorpati has become Municipality from VDC with the population of more than 500,000. Jorpati is the gateway for Sundarijaal and Sakhu.

References

Populated places in Kathmandu District